The Lincoln County Process is a step used in producing almost all Tennessee whiskeys. The whiskey is filtered through—or steeped in—charcoal chips before going into the casks for aging. The process is named for Lincoln County, Tennessee, which was the location of Jack Daniel's distillery at the time of its establishment, but is no longer used in that county (where the only remaining distilleries are Benjamin Prichard's and Southern Pride Distillery).

Methods
Nearly every distillery creating Tennessee whisky uses maple charcoal filtering, though the actual process for accomplishing this varies by company. 

For Jack Daniel's, the charcoal used is created onsite from stacks (ricks) of two-by-two-inch sugar maple timbers. The timbers are primed with 140 proof Jack Daniel's and then ignited under large hoods to prevent sparks. Once they reach the char state, the ricks are sprayed with water to prevent complete combustion. The resulting charcoal is then fed through a grinder to produce bean-size pellets that are packed into  vats used to filter impurities from the 140 proof whiskey. The whiskey is then reduced with water to 125 proof for aging. The process was taught to Jack Daniel by Nearest Green, the namesake of Uncle Nearest Premium Whiskey.

The George Dickel distillery uses deeper vats and distills the whisky—the spelling used by Dickel—to 135 proof. Dickel chills its whisky to  before it enters the vats and allows the liquid to fill the vats instead of trickling it through.

Nelson's Green Brier Distillery uses the Lincoln County Process to make its wheated First 108 Tennessee whiskey and its white whiskey.   

Collier and McKeel, made in Nashville, uses a method that pumps the whiskey slowly through  feet of sugar maple charcoal (instead of using gravity) made from trees cut by local sawmills.

Legal considerations
To be labeled as a straight whiskey, no flavoring or coloring compounds can be added to the spirit after the fermenting of the grain.

Some producers claim that according to a 1941 Internal Revenue Service ruling issued at the request of Jack Daniel Distillery, the Lincoln County Process is what distinguishes "Tennessee whiskey" from "bourbon". However, not all producers of products labeled as Tennessee whiskey use the process. (Specifically, it is not used in the production of Benjamin Prichard's Tennessee Whiskey.)

The term "Tennessee whiskey" does not actually have a legal definition in the U.S. Federal regulations that define the Standards of Identity for Distilled Spirits. The only legal definition of Tennessee whiskey in U.S. federally recognized legislation is the North American Free Trade Agreement (NAFTA), which states only that Tennessee whiskey is "a straight Bourbon Whiskey authorized to be produced only in the State of Tennessee". This definition is also recognized in the law of Canada, which states that Tennessee whiskey must be "a straight Bourbon Whiskey produced in the State of Tennessee". None of these regulations requires the use of the Lincoln County filtering process (or any other filtering process).

On May 13, 2013, the governor of Tennessee signed House Bill 1084, requiring maple charcoal filtering to be used for products produced in the state labeling themselves as "Tennessee whiskey" (with a particular exception tailored to exempt Benjamin Prichard's) and including the existing requirements for bourbon. As federal law requires statements of origin on labels to be accurate, the Tennessee law effectively gives a firm definition to Tennessee whiskey.

References

Tennessee whiskey
Lincoln County, Tennessee
Distillation